New Haven Township is an inactive township in Franklin County, in the U.S. state of Missouri.

New Haven Township was established in 1873, taking its name from the community of New Haven, Missouri.

References

Townships in Missouri
Townships in Franklin County, Missouri